Hilbert's nineteenth problem is one of the 23 Hilbert problems, set out in a list compiled in 1900 by David Hilbert. It asks whether the solutions of regular problems in the calculus of variations are always analytic. Informally, and perhaps less directly, since Hilbert's concept of a "regular variational problem" identifies precisely a variational problem whose Euler–Lagrange equation is an elliptic partial differential equation with analytic coefficients, Hilbert's nineteenth problem, despite its seemingly technical statement, simply asks whether, in this class of partial differential equations, any solution function inherits the relatively simple and well understood structure from the solved equation. Hilbert's nineteenth problem was solved independently in the late 1950s by Ennio De Giorgi and John Forbes Nash, Jr.

History

The origins of the problem

David Hilbert presented the now called Hilbert's nineteenth problem in his speech at the second International Congress of Mathematicians. In  he states that, in his opinion, one of the most remarkable facts of the theory of analytic functions is that there exist classes of partial differential equations which admit only such kind of functions as solutions, adducing Laplace's equation, Liouville's equation, the minimal surface equation and a class of linear partial differential equations studied by Émile Picard as examples. He then notes the fact that most of the partial differential equations sharing this property are the Euler–Lagrange equation of a well defined kind of variational problem, featuring the following three properties:
,
,
Hilbert calls this kind of variational problem a "regular variational problem": property  means that such kind of variational problems are minimum problems, property  is the ellipticity condition on the Euler–Lagrange equations associated to the given functional, while property  is a simple regularity assumption the function . Having identified the class of problems to deal with, he then poses the following question:-"... does every Lagrangian partial differential equation of a regular variation problem have the property of admitting analytic integrals exclusively?" and asks further if this is the case even when the function is required to assume, as it happens for Dirichlet's problem on the potential function, boundary values which are continuous, but not analytic.

The path to the complete solution
Hilbert stated his nineteenth problem as a regularity problem for a class of elliptic partial differential equation with analytic coefficients, therefore the first efforts of the researchers who sought to solve it were directed to study the regularity of classical solutions for equations belonging to this class. On the other hand, direct methods in the calculus of variations showed the existence of solutions with very weak differentiability properties. For many years  there was a gap between these results: the solutions that could be constructed were known to have square integrable second derivatives, which was not quite strong enough to feed into the machinery that could prove they were analytic, which needed continuity of first derivatives. They were able to show the solutions had first derivatives that were Hölder continuous, which by previous results implied that the solutions are analytic whenever the differential equation has analytic coefficients,  thus completing the solution of Hilbert's nineteenth problem.

Counterexamples to various generalizations of the problem
The affirmative answer to Hilbert's nineteenth problem given by Ennio De Giorgi and John Forbes Nash raised the question if the same conclusion holds also for Euler-lagrange equations of more general functionals: at the end of the 1960s,  and  constructed independently several counterexamples, showing that in general there is no hope to prove such kind of regularity results without adding further hypotheses.

Precisely,  gave several counterexamples involving a single elliptic equation of order greater than two with analytic coefficients: for experts, the fact that such kind of equations could have nonanalytic and even nonsmooth solutions created a sensation.

 and  gave counterexamples showing that in the case when the solution is vector-valued rather than scalar-valued, it need not be analytic: the example of De Giorgi consists of an elliptic system with bounded coefficients, while the one of Giusti and Miranda has analytic coefficients. Later on,  provided other, more refined, examples for the vector valued problem.

De Giorgi's theorem
The key theorem proved by De Giorgi is an a priori estimate stating that if u is a solution of a suitable linear second order strictly elliptic PDE of the form

and  has square integrable first derivatives, then  is Hölder continuous.

Application of De Giorgi's theorem to Hilbert's problem
Hilbert's problem asks whether the minimizers  of an energy functional such as

are analytic. The smoothness of  can be shown using De Giorgi's theorem
as follows. The Euler–Lagrange equation for this variational problem is the non-linear equation

and differentiating this with respect to  gives

This means that  satisfies the linear equation

with 

so by De Giorgi's result the solution w has Hölder continuous first derivatives, provided the matrix  is bounded. When this is not the case, a further step is needed: one must prove that the solution  is Lipschitz continuous, i.e. the gradient  is an  function.

Once w is known to have Hölder continuous (n+1)st derivatives for some n ≥ 1, then the coefficients aij have Hölder continuous nth derivatives, so a theorem of Schauder implies that the (n+2)nd derivatives are also Hölder continuous, so repeating this infinitely often shows that the solution w is smooth.

Nash's theorem

Nash gave a continuity estimate for solutions of the parabolic equation

where u is a bounded function of x1,...,xn, t defined for t ≥ 0. From his estimate Nash was able to deduce a continuity estimate for solutions of the elliptic equation 
 by considering the special case when u does not depend on t.

Notes

References
.
.
.
.
.
.
.
.
.
.

.
.
.
.
.
.
.

19
Partial differential equations
Calculus of variations